Francisco Javier Gudiño Ortíz (born 6 January 1968) is a Mexican politician affiliated with the Institutional Revolutionary Party (earlier he was affiliated with the National Action Party). As of 2014 he served as Deputy of the LX Legislature of the Mexican Congress representing Jalisco.

References

1968 births
Living people
Politicians from Jalisco
Institutional Revolutionary Party politicians
National Action Party (Mexico) politicians
21st-century Mexican politicians
Members of the Chamber of Deputies (Mexico) for Jalisco